Adrianus "Ard" Schenk (born 16 September 1944) is a former speed skater from the Netherlands, who is considered to be one of the best in history. His first Olympic success came in 1968, when he won a silver medal at the 1968 Winter Olympics. Between 1970 and 1972 Winter Olympics, Schenk won three consecutive World Allround Speed Skating Championships. He won three gold medals at the 1972 Winter Olympics, becoming, along with Galina Kulakova of Soviet Union, the most successful athlete there.

Biography

Schenk competed in international meets from 1964 on, winning his first medal at the 1965 world championships and his first gold medal at the 1966 European championships. In the late 60s, Schenk was usually bested by his compatriot Kees Verkerk, but in the early 1970s he dominated international speed skating. The winning duo of Ard & Keesie were responsible for a lasting popularity of speed skating in the Netherlands.

Schenk's career peaked in 1972. He won three gold medals during the Olympic Games in Sapporo (a fall on the 500 m precluded gold in all 4 distances). Had the 1000 meters already been an Olympic distance, Schenk would have been the favorite for gold, as he had won five of the six 1000 meter races at World Sprint Championship he participated in. The same year, he also won the European Allround and the World Allround Championships. He became World Allround Champion by winning all 4 distances, a feat that nobody had achieved since Ivar Ballangrud 40 years earlier, and which only Eric Heiden has repeated since (in 1979). Finally, he won bronze that year at the World Sprint Championships.

The next season (1973), he turned professional with a number of other prominent speed skaters, thereby foregoing the opportunity of winning more championships. The professional circuit lasted two seasons and Schenk retired from speed skating at the relatively young age of 30.

Records

World records 
Schenk was the first to skate the 10,000 meters within 15 minutes, and the first skater to finish the 1500 meters in less than 2 minutes. Over the course of his career he broke a total of 18 (senior) world records, a feat no skater before or after him has bettered. Among men, the sprint specialist Jeremy Wotherspoon came closest with his 16th world record in 2007, while among women long-distance specialist Gunda Niemann equalled Schenk's mark in 2001. By March 1971, Schenk held 6 of the 7 official world records at the same time, missing only the 500 m. His 1000 m record was broken in March 1972 by Erhard Keller, but the other five stood until 1975 to 1978, when world records started to be skated at the high-altitude rink of Medeo.

Source: SpeedSkatingStats.com

Personal records

Schenk has an Adelskalender score of 166.241 points. He was number one on the Adelskalender from 13 January 1966 until 27 February 1967 and again from 13 February 1971 until 19 March 1976 for a total of 6 years and 58 days. The Adelskalender is an all-time allround speed skating ranking.

Tournament overview

Source:
 ISSL = International Speed Skating League
 ISU = International Skating Union

Medals won

See also
List of multiple Olympic gold medalists at a single Games

References

Bibliography

 Bal, Rien and Van Dijk, Rob. Schaatskampioenen, alles over het seizoen 68-69 (Speedskating Champions, all about the season 68-69) . Amsterdam, the Netherlands: N.V. Het Parool, 1969. (Dutch)
 Eng, Trond. All Time International Championships, Complete Results: 1889 - 2002. Askim, Norway: WSSSA-Skøytenytt, 2002.
 Froger, Fred R. Topsporters: Ard Schenk * Kees Verkerk (Elite  Athletes: Ard Schenk * Kees Verkerk). Bussum, the Netherlands: Van Holkema  & Warendorf, 1967. (Dutch)
 ___  Winnaars op de schaats (Victors on Skates), Een Parool Sportpocket. Amsterdam, the Netherlands: N.V. Het Parool, 1968. (Dutch)
 Koomen, Theo. 10 Jaar Topschaatsen (10 Years Elite Speedskating). Laren (NH), the Netherlands: Uitgeverij Luitingh, 1971. . (Dutch)
 _ Topschaatsen 1972 (Elite Speedskating 1972). Laren (NH), the Netherlands: Uitgeverij Luitingh, 1972. . (Dutch)
 _ Topschaatsen 3 (Elite Speedskating 3). Laren (NH), the Netherlands: Uitgeverij Luitingh, 1973. . (Dutch)
 Maaskant, Piet. Flitsende Ijzers, De geschiedenis van de schaatssport (Flashing Blades, the History of Dutch Speedskating). Zwolle, the Netherlands: La Rivière & Voorhoeve, 1967 (Second revised and expanded edition). (Dutch)
 _ Heya, Heya! Het nieuwe boek van de Schaatssport (Heya, Heya! The New book of Dutch Speedskating). Zwolle, the Netherlands: La Rivière & Voorhoeve, 1970. (Dutch)
 Peereboom, Klaas. Van Jaap Eden tot Ard Schenk (From Jaap Eden till Ard Schenk). Baarn, the Netherlands: De Boekerij, 1972. . (Dutch)
 Schenk, Ard and Racké, Fred. Ard Apart, mijn groei naar de top (Ard on his own, his growth to the Top). Alkmaar, the Netherlands: Verenigde Noordhollandse Dagbladen, 1971. (Dutch)
 Teigen, Magne. Komplette Resultater Internasjonale Mesterskap 1889 - 1989: Menn/Kvinner, Senior/Junior, allround/sprint. Veggli, Norway: WSSSA-Skøytenytt, 1989. (Norwegian)
 Van Eyle, Wim. Een Eeuw Nederlandse Schaatssport (A Century of Dutch Speedskating). Utrecht, the Netherlands: Uitgeverij Het Spectrum, 1982. . (Dutch)
 Witkamp, Anton and Koning, Dolf (eds.). Schaatsgoud '72 (Speedskating Gold '72). Bussum, the Netherlands: Teleboek NV, 1972. . (Dutch)

External links

 
 
 Ard Schenk at Speed Skating Hall of Fame
 
 

1944 births
Living people
People from Anna Paulowna
Dutch male speed skaters
World record setters in speed skating
Olympic speed skaters of the Netherlands
Olympic gold medalists for the Netherlands
Olympic silver medalists for the Netherlands
Olympic medalists in speed skating
Speed skaters at the 1964 Winter Olympics
Speed skaters at the 1968 Winter Olympics
Speed skaters at the 1972 Winter Olympics
Medalists at the 1968 Winter Olympics
Medalists at the 1972 Winter Olympics
World Allround Speed Skating Championships medalists
World Sprint Speed Skating Championships medalists
Sportspeople from North Holland